Poiana Sibiului is a commune in Sibiu County, Transylvania, Romania. It is composed of a single village, Poiana Sibiului. The name means "the glade of Sibiu".

Position

The village is situated in the Cindrel Mountains at an altitude of about 900 meters, 35 km west of the county capital Sibiu, in the Mărginimea Sibiului ethnographic area.

History

The first written account dates from 1537. Compared with the neighbouring villages, Poiana is a later settlement of Romanian population that moved higher in the mountains presumably dislocated by Saxon settlements. The occupation shifted from agriculture to sheep-herding, which remains even today the main occupation.

References

Communes in Sibiu County
Localities in Transylvania